John Richard Harris (1910–1994) was an Irish entomologist, fishing consultant, tackle merchant, and author.

Harris was a keen angler and tier of flies from boyhood. He was a sometime merchant seaman, journalist, and freshwater biologist. He was a demonstrator in limnology at Trinity College, Dublin. He was a director of Garnetts & Keegan's Ltd, Dublin, gunsmiths and suppliers of fishing tackle, until his retirement in 1984. He wrote An Angler's Entomology, a book about mayflies for fly fishermen. He has been called, "perhaps the greatest living Irish angler-entomologist". He has also been described as, "a large affable man 'with a sharing attitude towards his whiskey and a colourful manner of expressing his trenchant views on fishing, fishermen, journalists, rugby, life and other matters'". Harris died in 1994.

Bibliography 
 New Naturalist #23

References 

1910 births
1994 deaths
Scientists from Dublin (city)
New Naturalist writers
Angling writers
Fly fishing